Bematistes indentata is a butterfly in the family Nymphalidae. It is found in Cameroon.

Description
. 
P. identata Btlr. (59 e) is similar to  P. excisa. male: transverse band of the forewing narrower than in excisa ; hindwing above similar to that of macaria , but lighter, with broad, light yellowish to light brown median band. female: transverse band of the forewing white; median band of the hindwing white or slightly yellowish, narrower than in excisa female, distinct also beneath and basally very sharply defined, narrower than the dark distal margin. Cameroons to Angola.

Taxonomy
See Pierre & Bernaud, 2014

References

External links
Die Gross-Schmetterlinge der Erde 13: Die Afrikanischen Tagfalter. Plate XIII 59 e

Butterflies described in 1895
Acraeini
Butterflies of Africa